Jemima "Mina" MacKenzie (August 18, 1872 – January 27, 1957) was a Canadian Christian medical missionary to India.

Life
A daughter of Simon and Ann (Murray) MacKenzie, she was born August 18, 1872, in Waterside, Pictou County, Nova Scotia, Canada. MacKenzie led her class in surgery and graduated from Dalhousie University in 1904 as one of the university's earliest female doctors.

After working in Boston to raise tuition money to enable her sister Molly to also complete a medical degree from Dalhousie, MacKenzie left America in September 1904 and traveled to India to work as a medical missionary. In 1909, MacKenzie established the Broadwell Christian Hospital in Fatehpur, where MacKenzie and her sister Mary worked for many years. MacKenzie's tireless efforts helped control the cholera epidemic during the 1917 Kumbh Mela pilgrimage. MacKenzie dedicated over three decades to provide medical services to the poor and sick in India. In 1919, MacKenzie was awarded the Kaiser-i-Hind Medal for Public Service in India and in 1940, Dalhousie University awarded her an honorary LLD degree.

References 

 
 
 
 
Canadiana – Volume 2 – Page 1143

External links 
 

Canadian Protestant missionaries
Christian medical missionaries
Female Christian missionaries
People from Kanpur
Protestant missionaries in India
1872 births
1957 deaths
People from Pictou County
Dalhousie University alumni
Canadian expatriates in India